Liotia echinacantha is a species of sea snail, a marine gastropod mollusk in the family Liotiidae.

Description
The height of the shell attains 6 mm and the diameter 7.5 mm. The strong, globose shell is narrowly and deeply umbilicate. It has the color of pale straw. The shell contains four whorls. The apical one is depressed. The characteristic scaly spines are hollow, fluted and cover profusely the surface. They are thrice-ranked on the penultimate whorl and six-ranked on the body whorl. Three of them are conspicuous, more particularly the one in both whorls just below the sutures. The three rows around the umbilicus are not so highly developed. The aperture is round. The horny operculum is multispiral.

Distribution
This species occurs in the Red Sea, Gulf of Oman and the Persian Gulf.

References

External links
 To World Register of Marine Species
 

echinacantha
Gastropods described in 1903